Onychogomphus assimilis is a species of dragonfly in the family Gomphidae. It is found in Armenia, Georgia, Iran, Turkey, and Turkmenistan. Its natural habitat is rivers. It is threatened by habitat loss.

References

Gomphidae
Taxonomy articles created by Polbot
Insects described in 1845